Caracui is a village in Hîncești District, Moldova.

References

Villages of Hîncești District